The 1991 UCF Knights football season was the thirteenth season for the team and Gene McDowell's seventh as the head coach of the Knights. McDowell led the team to an overall record of 6–5.

Schedule

References

UCF
UCF Knights football seasons
UCF Knights football